Magnetawan River Provincial Park is a waterway-class provincial park on the Magnetawan River in Parry Sound, Ontario, Canada.

A non-operating park, it offers neither facilities nor services. Its most popular use is for whitewater kayaking and canoeing.

See also
List of Ontario parks

External links

Provincial parks of Ontario
Parks in Parry Sound District
Protected areas established in 2003
2003 establishments in Ontario